Herbert Webb Gillman (18 May 1832 - 23 July 1898) was a Ceylonese Judge, the Postmaster General of Ceylon between 1867 and 1871 and an Irish historian.

Herbert Webb Gillman was born on 18 May 1832 in Coachford, County Cork, the only son of Herbert (1791-1877) and Esther née Bennett (1795-1842), third daughter of John Barter Bennett, a surgeon from Cork. His mother died when he was ten and in 1847 his father re-married Sarah Honeywood Pollock Skottowe Parker, the third daughter of Richard Neville Parker.

Gillman undertook his tertiary studies at Trinity College Dublin, where he received a gold medal in mathematics and graduated with a Bachelor of Arts in 1853. He was admitted to Lincoln's Inn, and was called to the bar on 26 January 1897. Whilst reading for a fellowship at Trinity College, he was offered and accepted a post in the Ceylon Civil Service, where he remained for some twenty years. During his tenure he served as Postmaster General (1867); District Judge, Galle (1872); and acting Treasurer of Ceylon, where he assisted in the decimalisation of the rupee. He also held positions on both the Legislative and Executive Councils.

In 1866 he married Annie Mackwood, second daughter of Francis Mackwood (a tea plantation owner). They had three children: Herbert Francis (1867-1918), who joined the Indian Civil Service and served as a member of the Madras Legislative Council; Webb (1870-1933) who served in several campaigns including the Second Boer War; Anglo-Aro War and World War I, reaching the rank of General, receiving a KCB, KCMG and DSO for his military service; and Frances Hetty (1876-1959), who married Eyre Herbert Ievers.

He retired from public service in 1875, for health reasons, and returned to the family home in Clontead More, to reside there with his family. His father died on 2 December 1877 as did his stepmother four months later, with Gillman inheriting the entire family estate. Gillman actively pursued his interests in antiquities and local history. He was made a fellow of the Royal Society of Antiquaries; a fellow of the Bibliographic Society of London; and in 1892 became one of the founding members of the Cork Historical and Archaeological Society, serving as its vice-president for a number of years. He authored and co-authored a number of articles for the Cork Historical and Archaeological Society, and became a leading authority on castles and tower houses in County Cork.

Gillman died on 23 July 1898, at the age of 66, and is buried in the graveyard at the Magourney Church in Coachford.

Bibliography

References

External links
Sri Lanka Post

1832 births
1898 deaths
People from County Cork
Alumni of Trinity College Dublin
Members of Lincoln's Inn
Postmasters General of Sri Lanka
19th-century Irish historians
Irish antiquarians
People from British Ceylon
Sri Lankan people of Irish descent
Official members of the Legislative Council of Ceylon